Jeanette Wohl (October 16, 1783 in Frankfurt am Main – November 27, 1861 in Paris) was a longtime friend and correspondent of Ludwig Börne. She inherited the rights to his literary works after his death and edited his works. She is buried at Père Lachaise Cemetery in Paris.

References
This article is based on the corresponding article on the German Wikipedia, which cites the following references:
 Gottlieb Schnapper-Arndt: Jeannette Straus-Wohl und ihre Beziehungen zu Börne in Westermanns illustrierte deutsche Monatshefte 1887, p. 46-48.
 Christa Walz: Jeanette Wohl und Ludwig Börne. Dokumentation und Analyse des Briefwechsels (= Campus Judaica 18). Frankfurt am Main: Campus, 2001.

External links

1783 births
1861 deaths
Writers from Frankfurt
Burials at Père Lachaise Cemetery
German women writers
19th-century women writers